Numa Peak is located in the Livingston Range, Glacier National Park in the U.S. state of Montana. The small Baby Glacier is below the peak to the immediate northeast.

See also
 List of mountains and mountain ranges of Glacier National Park (U.S.)

References

Livingston Range
Mountains of Flathead County, Montana
Mountains of Glacier National Park (U.S.)
Mountains of Montana